John Phillips  was a Federalist member of the U.S. House of Representatives who served Pennsylvania's 3rd congressional district from March 1821 to March 1823.

Philips, who was born in Chester County, served only a single term in the Seventeenth Congress. While it was noted that he had a limited education, there is remarkably little, if any, additional documentation available about him, including the years of his birth and death.

Sources

The Political Graveyard

People from Chester County, Pennsylvania
Year of birth unknown
Year of death unknown
Place of death unknown
Federalist Party members of the United States House of Representatives from Pennsylvania